Dhanga is a village located in  Madhubani district, Bihar, India. 

language:- Maithili

Country :- India

Pincode:- 847229

State :- Bihar

District :- Madhubani

References

Villages in Madhubani district